Yellow pea is a common name for several plants, and may refer to:

Lathyrus aphaca
Lathyrus pratensis

References